Dean Scott Hood (born November 15, 1963) is the head coach of the Murray State Racers football team.  The former head football coach at Eastern Kentucky University,  Hood was hired by EKU in January 2008 to replace former head coach Danny Hope after he left for Purdue University following the 2007 season.  The 2008 season ended successfully for Hood as he led the Colonels to the 2008 Ohio Valley Conference football title.

Coaching career
Hood was the defensive coordinator at Wake Forest University from 2001 to 2007, winning the ACC Championship in 2006 by beating Georgia Tech in the ACC Championship Game.  In that 2006 season, Hood's defense was ranked second in the conference in scoring defense (14.7/game) and led the league in interceptions with 22.  Wake Forest went on to accept their first, and only, BCS Bowl bid to play Louisville in the Orange Bowl.

He also had five-year stint at Eastern Kentucky from 1994 to 1998 season as an assistant coach under Roy Kidd.

Head coach Eastern Kentucky
Coach Hood took over as head coach for the Eastern Kentucky Colonels in 2008, winning the Ohio Valley Conference and making an appearance in the FCS playoffs in his first season.  For his efforts in his inaugural season, Coach Hood was named Ohio Valley Conference Coach of the Year in 2008.  Three seasons later in 2011, Hood's Colonels again won the Ohio Valley Conference and made Hood's second appearance in the FCS playoffs.

Since taking over the helm in 2008, Eastern Kentucky has won more conference games than any other team in the Ohio Valley Conference.
Hood was relieved of his coaching duties at Eastern on November 23, 2015.

Charlotte
Hood was announced as assistant head coach and tight ends coach for the Charlotte 49ers under head coach Brad Lambert on December 18, 2015. Lambert had worked with Hood at Wake Forest and had been his replacement as defensive coordinator for the Demon Deacons.

Head coaching record

References

External links
 Eastern Kentucky profile

1963 births
Living people
Charlotte 49ers football coaches
Colgate Raiders football coaches
Eastern Kentucky Colonels football coaches
Fairmont State Fighting Falcons football coaches
Glenville State Pioneers football coaches
Murray State Racers football coaches
Ohio Bobcats football coaches
Ohio Wesleyan Battling Bishops football players
Wake Forest Demon Deacons football coaches
Sportspeople from Ashtabula, Ohio